Computational Linguistics is a quarterly peer-reviewed open-access academic journal in the field of computational linguistics. It is published by MIT Press for the Association for Computational Linguistics (ACL). The journal includes articles, squibs and book reviews. It was established as the American Journal of Computational Linguistics in 1974 by David Hays and was originally published only on microfiche until 1978. George Heidorn transformed it into a print journal in 1980, with quarterly publication. In 1984 the journal obtained its current title. It has been open-access since 2009.

According to the Journal Citation Reports, the journal has a 2017 impact factor of 1.319.

Editors-in-chief
The following persons are or have been editors-in-chief:
 David G. Hays (1974–1978)
 George Heidorn (1980–1982)
 James F. Allen (1982–1993)
 Julia Hirschberg (1993–2003)
 Robert Dale (2003–2014)
 Paola Merlo (2014–2018)
 Hwee Tou Ng (2018-present)

References

External links

 Historical information from Julia Hirschberg, Editor, Computational Linguistics, updated June 2002

Computational linguistics journals
Publications established in 1974
Creative Commons Attribution-licensed journals
MIT Press academic journals
Quarterly journals
English-language journals
Academic journals associated with learned and professional societies
Association for Computational Linguistics